Bjorn Lindemann (23 January 1984) is a German former professional footballer who played as an attacking midfielder.

Career
Lindemann played in the youth for VfL Münchehagen, TSV Loccum and Hannover 96 II. From 2004 to 2006 he played for Holstein Kiel in the Regionalliga Nord. For the 2006–07 season, he moved to VfB Lübeck, where he played half a year. In the winter break, he joined 1. FC Magdeburg. In the summer of 2008, he moved to SC Paderborn 07. After a good first round, his performance dropped in the second half of the season so his contract was dissolved after the promotion of Paderborn in summer 2009.

Lindemann then transferred to VfL Osnabrück who were relegated from the 2. Bundesliga to the 3. Liga. Contributing eleven goals and twelve assists in the 2009–10 season he played a significant part in the promotion of Osnabrück to the 2. Bundesliga. In April 2011 he, along with Kevin Schöneberg, was suspended for appearing to training under the influence of alcohol.

On 28 January 2012, Lindemann signed with Thai side Army United F.C.

In September 2017, Lindemann returned to Germany, joining fourth-tier side 1. FC Germania Egestorf/Langreder from Sisaket.

In February 2019, Lindemann left SSV Jeddeloh after seven months by mutual consent.

In May 2020, it was reported that Lindemann had retired from playing.

Honours
VfL Osnabrück
 3. Liga: 2009–10

Individual
 3. Liga player of the year: 2009–10

References

External links

1984 births
Living people
Association football midfielders
German footballers
2. Bundesliga players
3. Liga players
Regionalliga players
Bjorn Lindemann
Hannover 96 players
Holstein Kiel players
VfB Lübeck players
1. FC Magdeburg players
SC Paderborn 07 players
VfL Osnabrück players
FC Carl Zeiss Jena players
Bjorn Lindemann
Bjorn Lindemann
Bjorn Lindemann
Bjorn Lindemann
Bjorn Lindemann
1. FC Germania Egestorf/Langreder players
SSV Jeddeloh players
German expatriate footballers
German expatriate sportspeople in Thailand
Expatriate footballers in Thailand
People from Nienburg (district)
Footballers from Lower Saxony